The following elections occurred in the year 1955.

Africa
 1955 Liberian general election
 1955 South-West African legislative election

Asia
 1955 Cambodian parliamentary election
 1955 Indonesian Constituent Assembly election
 1955 Indonesian legislative election
 1955 Israeli legislative election
 1955 Japanese general election
 1955 Malayan general election
 1955 Philippine Senate election
 1955 Singaporean general election
 1955 Soviet Union regional elections
 1955 State of Vietnam referendum

Europe
 1955 Maltese general election
 1955 Soviet Union regional elections
 1955 Norwegian local elections
 1955 Swedish driving side referendum

Germany
 1955 Rhineland-Palatinate state election

United Kingdom
 1955 United Kingdom general election
 1955 Labour Party leadership election
 List of MPs elected in the 1955 United Kingdom general election
 1955 Mid Ulster by-election
 1955 South Norfolk by-election
 1955 Orpington by-election
 1955 Twickenham by-election
 1955 Wrexham by-election

North America

Canada
 1955 Alberta general election
 1955 Edmonton municipal election
 1955 Ontario general election
 1955 Prince Edward Island general election
 1955 Toronto municipal election
 1955 Yukon general election

Mexico
 1955 Mexican legislative election

Australia
 1955 Australian federal election
 1955 Tasmanian state election

South America
 1955 Brazilian presidential election
 1955 Guatemalan parliamentary election

See also

 
1955
Elections